As the 32-bit Intel Architecture became the dominant computing platform during the 1980s and 1990s, multiple companies have tried to build microprocessors that are compatible with that Intel instruction set architecture. Most of these companies were not successful in the mainstream computing market. So far, only AMD has had any market presence in the computing market for more than a couple of product generations. Cyrix was successful during the 386 and 486 generations of products, but did not do well after the Pentium was introduced.

List of former IA-32 compatible microprocessor vendors:

Progressed into surviving companies
 Centaur Technology – originally subsidiary of IDT, later acquired by VIA Technologies, still producing compatible low-end devices for VIA
 Cyrix – acquired by National Semiconductor, later acquired by VIA Technologies, eventually shut down
 NexGen – bought by AMD to help develop the successful K6 device
 National Semiconductor – low-end 486 (designed in-house) never widely sold; first acquirer of Cyrix, later keeping only low-end IA-32 devices targeted for consumer System-on-a-chips, finally selling them to AMD

Product discontinued/transformed
 Harris Corporation – sold radiation-hardened versions of the 8086 and 80286; product line discontinued. Produced 20 MHz and 25 MHz 80286s (some motherboards were equipped with cache memory, which was unusual for 80286 processors).
 NEC – sold processors, such as NEC V20 and NEC V30, that were compatible with early Intel 16-bit architectures; product line transitioned to NEC-designed architectures.
 Siemens – sold versions of the 8086 and 80286; product line discontinued.
 VM Technology – developed VM860 (8086-compatible processor) and VM8600SP (386-compatible processor) for the Japanese market.

Left the market or closed
 Chips and Technologies – left market after failed 386 compatible chip failed to boot the Windows operating system
 IBM – Cyrix licensee and developer of Blue Lightning 486 line of processors, eventually left compatible chip market
 Rise Technology – after five years of working on the slow mP6 chip (released in 1998), the company closed a year later
 Texas Instruments and SGS-Thomson – licensees of Cyrix designs, eventually left compatible chip market
 Transmeta – transitioned to an intellectual property company in 2005
 United Microelectronics Corporation and Meridian Semiconductor – got out of market after slow 486 compatible missed market window

Incomplete/unsuccessful projects

 Chromatic Research – media processor with x86 instruction set compatibility never completed
 Exponential Technology – x86-compatible microprocessor never completed
 IIT Corp – 486-compatible project never completed
 International Meta Systems – Pentium/PPro-class processors "Meta 6000", "Meta 6500", "Meta 7000/BiFrost" never completed
 MemoryLogix – multi-threaded CPU core "MLX1" and SOC for PCs never completed
 Metaflow Technologies – 486-class processor "CP100" never released
 Montalvo Systems – asymmetric multiprocessor never completed
 ULSI System Technology – never completed x86 SOC; company shut down after one of their employees was convicted for stealing Intel floating-point x87 design documents

See also
 List of x86 manufacturers

References

List of former IA32 compatible processor manufacturers
Computing-related lists
Computing by company
Former IA-32 compatible processor